Ippolito Marsigli (died 1546) was a Roman Catholic prelate who served as Bishop of Alife (1541–1546).

Biography
On 6 Apr 1541, Ippolito Marsigli was appointed during the papacy of Pope Paul III as Bishop of Alife.
He served as Bishop of Alife until his death in 1546.

References

External links and additional sources
 (for Chronology of Bishops) 
 (for Chronology of Bishops) 

16th-century Italian Roman Catholic bishops
Bishops appointed by Pope Paul III
1546 deaths